The Hamiltonstövare is a breed of dog, bred as a hunting hound. The breed was developed in Sweden by the founder of the Swedish Kennel Club, Count Adolf Hamilton. Its ancestry includes several German hounds as well as English Foxhounds and Harriers.

The breed is known by the white blaze on the head, down the neck, four white paws, and a white tail tip.  It differs from an English Foxhound in that its frame is lighter.

General Appearance
Rectangular, well proportioned, giving impression of great strength and stamina. Tricoloured.

Characteristics
Handsome, upstanding dog of striking colouring. Hardy and sound.

Head and Skull
Head longish, rectangular, with slightly arched and moderately broad skull. Occiput not too prominent. Stop well defined but not over pronounced. Jowls not too heavy. Muzzle fairly long, large and rectangular. Bridge of nose straight and parallel to line of skull. Nose always black, well developed with large nostrils. Upper lips full but not too overhanging.

Eyes
Clear and dark brown with tranquil expression.

Ears
Set fairly high, when drawn alongside jaw, ears extend to approximately halfway along muzzle and should be raised only slightly above skull when responding to call. Soft with straight fall and fore edge not folded out.

Mouth
Jaws strong, with a perfect, regular and complete scissor bite, i.e. upper teeth closely overlapping lower teeth and set square to the jaws.

Neck
Long and powerful, merging well into shoulders, skin on neck supple and close fitting.

Forequarters
Shoulders muscular and well laid back. When viewed from front forelegs appear straight and parallel. Upper foreleg long and broad and set at a right angle to shoulder blade. Elbows set close in to body.

Body
Back straight and powerful. Strong, broad, muscular loin. Croup slightly inclined. Chest deep, ribs moderately sprung, back ribs proportionately long. Belly slightly tucked up.

Hindquarters
Strong and parallel when viewed from behind. Well angulated, muscle well developed and broad when seen from side.

Feet
Short and hard. Pads firm and pointing straight forward.

Tail
Set on low, in an almost straight continuation of line of back. In length reaches hock. Fairly wide at base and narrowing off towards tip. Held in straight position or curving slightly in sabre-like shape. Not carried above the backline when moving.

Coat
Coat consists of two layers. Undercoat short, close and soft, especially thick during winter. Upper coat strongly weather-resistant lying close to body. On underside of tail, ordinary hair quite long but not forming a fringe. Ample hair between pads.

Colour
Upper side of neck, back, sides of trunk and upper side of tail black. Head and legs, as well as side of neck, trunk and tail brown. White markings as follows: blaze on upper part of muzzle, underside of neck, breast and tip of tail, lower legs and feet.

A mixture of black and brown undesirable, as is a preponderance of any of the three permissible colours.

Gait/Movement
Free striding and long reaching. Hindlegs showing drive. Not moving close behind.

Temperament
A typical hound in temperament—sweet and friendly to all—the Hamiltonstövare is also a hardworking hunter. It is happy to be with its family, but it is also happy to be out hunting.

The Hamiltonstövare is its "own hound," and although it is friendly and gregarious, it naturally defers to doing what it wants rather than what might be requested of it. It takes enthusiasm and praise to persuade the Hamiltonstovare to comply with its owner's requests, but it'll do it if it's inspired.

Size
Male Dogs: 53–61 cm (21–24 in). The ideal size is 57 cm (22½ in).

Female Dogs: 49–57 cm (19¼ - 22½ in).  The ideal size is 53 cm (21 in).

Faults
Any departure from the foregoing points should be considered a fault and the seriousness with which the fault should be regarded should be in exact proportion to its degree and its effect upon the health and welfare of the dog.

See also
 Dogs portal
 List of dog breeds

Dog breeds originating in Sweden
FCI breeds
Rare dog breeds
Scent hounds